Rita  Keegan (born 1949) is an American-born artist, lecturer and archivist, based in England since the late 1970s. She is a multi-media artist whose work uses video and digital technologies. Keegan is best known for her involvement with in the UK's Black Arts Movement in the 1980s and her work documenting artists of colour in Britain.

Biography
Born Rita Morrison in the Bronx, New York City, to a Dominican mother and Canadian father, she described her upbringing in the Bronx as having "more in common with an English/Commonwealth background". She graduated from the High School of Art and Design focusing on illustration and costume design, then obtained a fine arts degree at the San Francisco Art Institute, where her teachers included the photographer Imogen Cunningham and the African-American artist Mary O'Neill. Keegan moved to London, England, in the late 1970s.

Keegan originally trained as a painter but in the 1980s begin to incorporate lens-based media, using the photocopier and computer in both 2D and installation work. In 1984 she worked at  "Community Copyart" in London. The GLC-funded organisation was an affordable resource centre for voluntary groups to create they own print material in addition to working with artists who wanted to use the photocopier as a form of printmaking.

Keegan was a founding member of the artists' collectives Brixton Art Gallery in 1982, and later Women's Work and Black Women in View. She went on to co-curate Mirror Reflecting Darkly, Brixton Art Gallery's first exhibition by the Black Women Artists collective. From 1985 Keegan was a staff member at the Women Artists Slide Library (WASL), where she established and managed the Women Artists of Colour Index. She was Director of the African and Asian Visual Arts Archive from 1992 to 1994. In 2021 she had a solo exhibition Somewhere Between There and Here at the South London Gallery

Keegan taught New Media and Digital Diversity at Goldsmiths, University of London, where she also  helped establish the digital-media undergraduate course in the Historical and Cultural Studies department.

Selected exhibitions
 2021: Somewhere Between There and Here solo exhibition at the South London Gallery
 2006: Transformations, Lewisham Arthouse and Horniman Museum, London (solo)
 1997: Transforming the Crown: African, Asian and Caribbean Artists in Britain, 1966-1996, Studio Museum in Harlem, Bronx Museum of the Arts, and Caribbean Cultural Center (Manhattan), New York
 1998: Family Histories: Eating with Our Memories, Sleeping with the Ancestors, 198 Gallery, London (solo)
 1995: Time Machine: Ancient Egypt and Contemporary Art, InIVA and British Museum, London
 1993: Rites of Passage, ICA, London (solo)
 1992: Trophies of Empire, Arnolfini Gallery, Bristol and Bluecoat, Liverpool curated by Keith Piper
 1992: White Noise: Artists Working with Sound, Ikon Gallery, Birmingham
 1991: Four X 4 curated by Eddie Chambers, Wolverhampton Art Gallery, Wolverhampton
 1991: Family Album: An exhibition by Brixton Black Women Artists, Copyart Resource Centre, London
 1990: Let the Canvas Come to Life with Dark Faces, Bluecoat
 1985: Mirror Reflecting Darkly: Black Women's Art, Brixton Art Gallery, London
 1983: Women's Work, Brixton Art Gallery, London

References

Further reading
 Rita Keegan, "The Story So Far", Spare Rib, February 1990, Issue 209, p. 36.
 Rita Keegan, "Once Upon a Time", Spare Rib, December–January 1988, Issue 197, p. 44.
 Guy Burch; Françoise Dupré (2011). Brixton Calling!: Then & Now: Brixton Art Gallery & the Brixton Artists Collective. .

External links
 "Rita Keegan" (YouTube video, posted 9 August 2013), SamtheWheels, 2008.
 Women of Colour Index archive record at The Women's Art Library at Goldsmiths College, London.

1949 births
Living people
Black British artists
20th-century British women artists
21st-century British women artists
San Francisco Art Institute alumni
American archivists
British archivists
High School of Art and Design alumni
Female archivists
Artists from New York City
American emigrants to England